Rough fescue is a common name for several plant and may refer to:
 Festuca altaica, perennial bunchgrass native to Asia and North America
 Festuca campestris, grass native to western North America